Mochdre  may refer to:
Mochdre, Conwy, north Wales
Mochdre, Powys, west Wales